The Jeremiah S. Gilbert House is a NRHP-listed property in the neighborhood of Perkerson, Atlanta. It is one of the city's oldest surviving structures.

Jeremiah S. Gilbert was the original owner of the land which is now the Perkerson neighborhood.

The Gilbert House is described as significant as the home of one of Atlanta's earliest families, a rare example of fieldstone, mortar, and wood construction, and as a rare existing example of an Atlanta farmhouse.

After renovation in 1984, it was opened as a Cultural Arts Center operated by the City of Atlanta Office of Cultural Affairs.

The house is also designated as a City of Atlanta Landmark Site. Visitors can view original family furniture, photographs, and artifacts.

References

External links
"Jeremiah S. Gilbert House", City of Atlanta website

Houses on the National Register of Historic Places in Georgia (U.S. state)
City of Atlanta-designated historic sites
1866 establishments in Georgia (U.S. state)
National Register of Historic Places in Atlanta
Houses completed in 1866
Houses in Atlanta